Roskilde Festival 2009 was held on 2–5 July with warmup from 28 June. The final and 180th act was announced on 15 June.

Sales

The audience kept an eye on the weather forecasts before making up their mind to go or not. In any case, the ticket sale stats showed themselves from a somewhat unpredictable side, and it was difficult to tell how large an audience to expect at Roskilde Festival 2009.

When the festival was about to begin, rumours said that about 60,000 of 75,000 tickets were sold. However, it turned out that many more people wanted to take part in the festival. 67,000 all-week tickets were sold, and a new initiative – one-day tickets – were sold to over 12,000 people on top of this. Despite a non-sold-out festival, accounts showed a nice profit.

In 2010 Roskilde Festival could proudly present an overall profit of 2.7 million euro from the 2009th festival, which is the best economic result in the festival's 39-year-old existence.

The profits were distributed to charitable and cultural projects in accordance with the society’s objects clause.

Weather

Roskilde Festival 2009 was the hottest in 33 years according to the festival newspaper Orange Press.

New features

 A 30 meter high Ferris wheel was installed behind the grandstand of Orange Stage, which made it possible to get a nice view of the festival place. But not before the audience had delivered energy for the wheel by cycling for five minutes. The Ferris wheel was sponsored by Roskilde Festivals headsponsor Tuborg.
 The Human Carwash made it possible for the audience to combine pleasure and bodily hygiene.
 As a part of the festival's climate campaign Green Footsteps, the audience took more than 40,000 actions that have reduced the energy consumption and thereby CO2 emission. On top of that, more than 17,000 festival-goers signed a petition saying that Denmark and other wealthy countries should help third world countries handle the climate changes.

Line up

The festival was hit by a major cancellation, when rapper Lil Wayne had to cancel due to sickness.
He was replaced by Gogol Bordello who played the only 6 starred concert at the festival.

Orange stage was opened by Swedish rapper Petter, who had prominent visitors on stage such as Dee Pee from Rockers by Choice and L.O.C., who was on Orange stage for the third year running (featuring on Nephew's Hospital in 2007, and his own concert in 2008). Petter has been called a failure for this concert, because he was not able to get a full crowd, and the opening of Orange has to be big.

Nine Inch Nails played at Orange Stage Friday night at 01.00am - 03.00am and gave what several Danish newspapers called "the best concert of Roskilde '09". Nine Inch Nails were on "Wave Goodbye" tour.

Roskilde '09 also meant the anticipated return of the Danish hip-hop group Malk de Koijn, who played a 2-hour concert the night between Saturday and Sunday at Arena, and a big party-atmosphere at Orange Stage Thursday night, when Trentemøller and prominent guests made all of the crowd dance as if they were clubbing.

Danish rapper Jooks played as an up-and-coming act at Pavilion Junior Wednesday in the warm up days, and due to him having a major hit after he was booked (Hun vil ha' en rapper), the tent was packed to the limit in a concert, who could easily have filled one of the bigger stages.

Band list

The 20Belows (DK)
2562 (NL)
2manydjs (BEL)
Adam Tensta (S)
Alamaailman Vasarat (FIN)
Lily Allen (UK)
Tony Allen (NGA)
Amadou & Mariam (MAL)
Amon Amarth (S)
Analogik (DK)
...And You Will Know Us by the Trail of Dead (US)
Ass (S)
August (DK)
Babian (S)
Baddies (UK)
Baden/Peder/Struck (DK)
Issa Bagayogo (MALI)
Balstyrko (DK)
Asle Bjørn (DK)
Black Dice (US)
Bodebrixen (DK)
Bomba Estéreo (COL)
Peter Broderick (US)
The Bronx (US)
Cancer Bats (CAN)
Nick Cave and the Bad Seeds (AUS)
The Chap (UK)
Chocquibtown (COL)
Chris Coco (UK)
Tim Christensen (DK)
Cody (DK)
Cola Freaks (DK)
Coldplay (UK)
Cut Off Your Hands (NZ)
Darkane (S)
Dawn of Demise (DK)
The Deadly Gentlemen (US)
Deadmau5 (CAN)
Deerhoof (US/JPN)
Deichkind (DE)
Den Sorte Skole (DK)
The Dodos (US)
Peter Doherty (UK)
Down (US)
Dragontears (DK)
Dub Colossus (UK/ETH)
Dungen (S)
Eagles of Death Metal (US)
El Hijo de la Cumbia & Anasol MC (ARG)
Elbow (UK)
Escho presents Thulebasen, Alle Med Balloner og Terraser and Lamburg Tony (DK)
Faith No More (US)
Fever Ray (S)
The Field (S) 
First Aid Kit (S)
Fleet Foxes (US)
Friendly Fires (UK)
Frightened Rabbit (UK)
Fucked Up (CAN)
Gang Gang Dance (US)
Gangbé Brass Band (BEN)
The Gaslight Anthem (US)
Get Well Soon (DE)
Giana Factory (DK)
Ginger Ninja (DK)
Glasvegas (UK)
Gogol Bordello (US) 
Gojira (FR)
Pete Gooding (UK)
Groundation (US)
Hanggai (CHN)
Will Harold (UK)
Harrys Gym (N)
Jon Hassell & Maarifa Street (US)
Hauschka (DE)
Håkan Hellström (S)
Hjaltalín (ISL)
Hot 8 Brass Band (US)
Huntsville (N)
I Got You On Tape (DK)
I'm from Barcelona (S)
Ida Maria (N)
Imam Baildi (GR)
Isis (US)
Grace Jones (JAM)
Jooks (DK)
Kasai Allstars (CD)
Kassav' (FR. ANT)
Katzenjammer (N)
KB18 presents Waqar & Kobbe (DK)
Kellermensch (DK)
Kira Kira (ISL)
Klovner i Kamp (N)
Krede (DK)
Kvelertak (N)
La-33 (COL)
Labrassbanda (DE)
La Coka Nostra (US)
Little Boots (UK)
Lucy Love (DK)
Lulu Rouge (DK)
Ulf Lundell (S)
Madness (UK)
Magnifico (SVN)
Major Lazer (US)
Malk de Koijn (DK)
The Mars Volta (US)
The Megaphonic Thrift (N)
Men Among Animals (band) (DK)
Mew (DK)
MFMB (S)
Micachu & The Shapes (UK)
Tom Middleton (UK)
Mike Salta (DK)
Mikkel Metal (DK)
Mono (JPN)
Mungolian Jet Set (N)
M. Ward (US)
Marissa Nadler (US)
Nancy Elizabeth (UK)
N.A.S.A. (US)
Negash Ali (DK)
Neurosis (US)
Nine Inch Nails (US)
Novalima (PER)
Oasis (UK)
Oh No Ono (DK)
Oliver Jones (DK)
Opgang F (DK)
Orka (FO)
Pablo Moses & U-Roy (JAM)
José Padilla (E)
The Pains of Being Pure at Heart (US)
Pede B (DK)
Pet Shop Boys (UK)
Petter (S)
Pharfar presents A Rub A Dub Night feat. special guests (INT)
Radioclit presents The Very Best (INT)
Rubberhead Banditz (DK)
Paavoharju (FIN)
Rumpistol (DK)
Röyksopp (N)
Satyricon (N)
Scamp (DK)
Shastriya Syndicate (IND)
Mike Sheridan (DK)
Mikael Simpson & Sølvstorm (DK)
Skambankt (N)
Slipknot (US)
Socalled (CAN)
Social Distortion (US)
The Soft Pack (US)
Soil & "Pimp" Sessions (JPN)
Peter Sommer (DK)
St. Vincent (US)
Steinski (US)
Stella Polaris Sound System (DK)
Marnie Stern (US)
Tako Lako (DK)
The Telstar Sound Drone (DK)
Shugo Tokumaru (JPN)
Rokia Traoré (MALI)
Trentemøller (DJ set with live guests) (DK)
Trio Campanella (DK)
Twins Twins (DK)
Vektormusik (DK)
Vinnie Who (DK)
Volbeat (DK)
Von Dü (DK)
Wavves (US)
Kanye West (US)
White Lies (UK)
The Whitest Boy Alive (N/DE)
Lucinda Williams (US)
Jenny Wilson (S)
Wolves in the Throne Room (US)
Yeah Yeah Yeahs (US)
Yoga Fire (N)
Zizek Club (ARG)
Zu (I)
Århus E presents Puzzleweasel, Voks, Wäldchengarten, Vectral and Morten Riis (DK)

Notes and references

Roskilde Festival by year
2009 in Danish music
2009 music festivals